In mathematics, the correlation immunity of a Boolean function is a measure of the degree to which its outputs are uncorrelated with some subset of its inputs.

Definition 

Results in cryptography 
When used in a stream cipher as a combining function for linear feedback shift registers, a Boolean function with low-order correlation-immunity is more susceptible to a correlation attack than a function with correlation immunity of high order.

Siegenthaler showed that the correlation immunity m of a Boolean function of algebraic degree d of n variables satisfies m + d ≤ n; for a given set of input variables, this means that a high algebraic degree will restrict the maximum possible correlation immunity.  Furthermore, if the function is balanced then m + d ≤ n − 1.

References

Further reading
 Cusick, Thomas W. & Stanica, Pantelimon (2009). "Cryptographic Boolean functions and applications". Academic Press. .

Cryptography
Boolean algebra